Greenbush Brewing Co. is a brewery in Sawyer, MI, USA. Greenbush serves beer and Southern style barbeque. Greenbush Currently distributes beer in Michigan, Indiana, Illinois, and Kentucky. In addition to the Sawyer location, Greenbush has a location in South Bend, Indiana.

Taproom
Located at 5885 Sawyer Rd, The Greenbush Taproom has 28 taps, a full menu and a loyal Mug Club. Popular beer choices include: Star Chicken Shotgun (IPA, 6.8% ABV), Sunspot (Hefeweizen, 6.0% ABV), Oro de Tontos (Vienna Lager, 4.5% ABV), Brother Benjamin (Imperial IPA, 10.10% ABV), Distorter (Porter, 7.2% ABV) etc.

The Annex
 The Annex features a small pilot brewing system, 14 taps, a merchandise store, a shaded outdoor patio, occasional live music, and bocce ball courts. Food options at the Annex include sandwiches and charcuterie boards. Customers can also shop from deli options and Greenbush packaged food favorites including but not limited to Mustard Q (honey mustard), KC bbq sauce, bacon bleu dip, and Joique wing sauce.

References

External links
Company Website
Company Facebook Page

Beer brewing companies based in Michigan
2010 establishments in Michigan